The Triennale di Milano is a museum of art and design in the Parco Sempione in Milan, in Lombardy in northern Italy.

The Milan Triennial, an international exhibition of art and design, was held at the museum thirteen times between 1936 and 1996, and – after a break of twenty years – again in 2016.

Since 2003 the Triennale has awarded the triennial Gold Medal for Italian Architecture.

A permanent museum of Italian design, the Trienniale Design Museum, was opened in 2007.
It hosts design, architecture, and the visual, scenic and performing arts.

The building houses a theatre, the Teatro dell'Arte, which was also designed by Muzio.

References 

Art museums and galleries in Milan
Italian art institutions
Design museums
Italian design
1923 establishments in Italy
Italian fascist architecture
Modern art museums in Italy
Tourist attractions in Milan
Compasso d'Oro Award recipients